Finchley United Synagogue, more commonly known as Kinloss Synagogue, is a synagogue in Finchley, north London.

It is a member of the United Synagogue which makes it an Orthodox congregation.

The main synagogue holds up to 1,400 people and opened in 1967 

There is a Persian Sephardi synagogue within the building.

References

Synagogues in London
Finchley
Religion in the London Borough of Barnet